Mariyannapalya is a village near Hebbal in northern Bangalore, Karnataka, India. It contains the St. James church. In September 2008 the church was desecrated and had two gold plated crowns and cash from the offering box stolen and the main sacrament vandalised by miscreants during the 2008 attacks on Christians in southern Karnataka.

References

Villages in Bangalore Urban district
Neighbourhoods in Bangalore